Margëlliç is a small community of the Fier County, southern Albania. It is part of the municipality Patos. The settlement is close to the Margëlliç Castle and the ancient city of Byllis.

History 
In the 7th century the Margëlliç Castle was built by the Byzantines in the village. In WW2 a battle took place between Albanian Partisans and Nazi Germany in the village.

References

Populated places in Patos (municipality)
Villages in Fier County